Illya Petrovych Hadzhuk (born 2 August 2002) is a Ukrainian professional football midfielder who plays for Chornomorets Odesa in the Ukrainian Premier League.

Career
Born in Brovary, Hadzhuk spent time with several different youth academies. In April 2019 he was signed by Vorskla Poltava.

Hadzhuk made his debut as a substitute for Vorskla Poltava in a home match against Olimpik Donetsk on 28 June 2020.

References

External links
 
 

2002 births
Living people
People from Brovary
Ukrainian footballers
FC Vorskla Poltava players
FC Dynamo Kyiv players
FC Chornomorets Odesa players
Ukrainian Premier League players
Association football midfielders
Sportspeople from Kyiv Oblast